The Goudron River (in French: rivière Goudron) is a tributary of the east bank of the Kamouraska River, which flows on the south bank of the St. Lawrence river two km east of the centre of the village of Kamouraska.

The Goudron river flows on the Côte-du-Sud in the municipalities of Saint-André-de-Kamouraska, Sainte-Hélène-de-Kamouraska, Saint-Germain-de-Kamouraska, Saint-Pascal, and Kamouraska, in the Kamouraska Regional County Municipality, in the administrative region of Bas-Saint-Laurent, in province of Quebec, in Canada.

Geography 
Originating from a marsh area in Saint-André-de-Kamouraska, the Goudon River is located on either side of the highway 20 on the south of the dividing line with the Soucy-Lapointe stream which flows towards the Fouquette river; the latter empties on the southern coast of the estuary of Saint Lawrence.

  south-west in Saint-André-de-Kamouraska, to Route de la Station;
  southwest, to highway 20 that it crosses;
  southwesterly, along the northwest side of autoroute 20 that it crosses again at the limit of Saint-André-de-Kamouraska and Saint-Germain-de-Kamouraska;
  southerly, to the southern limit of the municipality of Sainte-Hélène-de-Kamouraska;
  northeasterly in Sainte-Hélène-de-Kamouraska, to the confluence of a stream coming from the north-east;
  southeasterly, up to the limit of Saint-Germain-de-Kamouraska;
  towards the south-west collecting the water of a stream coming from the south-east and crossing the road to Saint-Germain-de-Kamouraska, up to the limit of Kamouraska (Saint-Louis-de-Kamouraska sector);
  towards the south-west passing to the south-east of the "Montagne à Plourde", up to the confluence of the Poivrier stream;
  towards the south-west, passing to the south of the "cotton mountain" and crossing rue Varin on the east side of the village of Saint-Pascal, up to the bridge rue Rochette;
  west, to highway 20;
  north-west, up to the road to Rang de l'Embarrass;
  westward, up to its confluence.

Toponymy 
The toponym Rivière Goudron was formalized onDecember 5, 1968 by the Commission de toponymie du Québec.

See also 

 List of rivers of Quebec

References 

Rivers of Bas-Saint-Laurent
Kamouraska Regional County Municipality